Awaken Love is the second studio album by Matt Gilman. Forerunner Music released the album on August 27, 2013. Gilman worked with Ed Cash in the production of this album.

Critical reception

Awarding the album three stars for CCM Magazine, Matt Conner states, "it’s the worship leader’s incredible voice that tops the list." Mike Rimmer, rating the album an eight out of ten for Cross Rhythms, writes, "It's intimate worship ballads and anthems all the way here and I think I like it best when Matt chooses to go in an intense direction." Giving the album four stars at All about Worship, Mathew Reames describes, "This entire album is filled with songs that will bless you and your congregation."

Track listing

Charts

References

2014 albums
Matt Gilman albums